Qarineh Darreh (also Romanized as Qarīneh Darreh; also known as  Qarīneh Darreh-ye ‘Olyā) is a village in Hendudur Rural District, Sarband District, Shazand County, Markazi Province, Iran. At the 2006 census, its population was 128, in 30 families.

References 

Populated places in Shazand County